Intermittent catheterization is a medical technique used in conditions where patients need either short-term catheter-based management of the urinary bladder or as a daily habit for life. Intermittent catheterization is considered the "gold standard" for medical bladder emptying. Intermittent catheterization can be done by the patient or a caregiver in a home environment.

Advantages
People with neurogenic bladder disorders like spinal cord injury, spina bifida or multiple sclerosis, and non-neurogenic bladder disorders like obstruction due to prostate enlargement, urethral strictures or post-operative urinary retention, need to be continuously catheterised to empty their urinary bladders. But such continuous catheterization can lead to problems like urinary tract infections (UTI), urethral strictures or male infertility. Intermittent catheterization at regular intervals avoids such negative effects of continuous long term catheterization, but maintaining a low bladder pressure throughout the day.

Technique
It is unclear which catheter designs, techniques or strategies affect the incidence of UTI, which are preferable to users and which are most cost effective.

References

General
Taylor-LeMone: Fundamentals of Nursing. 7th edition, page 1246 
http://www.nature.com/sc/journal/v40/n9/full/3101312a.html
https://www.nursingtimes.net/clinical-archive/continence/reasons-for-intermittent-catheterisation-12-10-2010/

Catheters